MS GNV Aries was built as MS Norsea for North Sea Ferries as part of their response to the need for larger vessels in the mid to late 1980s. Therefore, North Sea Ferries designed their "3rd Generation" overnight ferry. The two parent companies within North Sea Ferries placed their orders in two separate locations. P&O placed its at Govan Shipbuilders on the River Clyde, and Nedlloyd placed their order with NKK in Yokohama, Japan.

Norsea entered service on the Hull-Rotterdam route. She was the largest passenger ship to be built on the Clyde since . It was also the last large passenger ship to be built in the United Kingdom. Once relieved of service on the Hull-Rotterdam route, the ship was sent off for two months major refurbishment and branding realignment, prior to entering service on the Hull-Zeebrugge route, and replacing the 27-year-old MS Norland in the new P&O colours.

The ship's name was also changed from Norsea to Pride of York, to bring the names in line with the rest of the P&O Ferries fleet.

In October 2020, P&O announced that the sister ships, and Pride of York and Pride of Bruges to be withdrawn due to the decline in traffic caused by the COVID-19 pandemic.  The final service from Hull left on 9 December 2020.

In 2021, both were sold to Grandi Navi Veloci with Pride of York being renamed GNV Aries.

Accidents and incidents

 On 5 February 1992, the lifeboat launching equipment at No 3 lifeboat station suffered a catastrophic failure during operational tests. The damage was very serious, to both the lifeboat and the vessel itself. The lifeboat then fell onto the dockside, where two of the four men on board the lifeboat were killed. The ship was under the operation of North Sea Ferries at the time of the accident.
 On 14 August 2002, Norsea had a fire in the forward engine room. This was caused by ignition of thermal heating oil, which leaked during repairs.
 On 2 September 2002, her aft engine room suffered a fire whilst on passage from Hull-Zeebrugge. She was about 7 miles off the East Anglian coast. The necessary steps were taken to extinguish the fire and no passengers were injured. However the third engineer was affected by smoke inhalation. The fire was caused by the failure of a low pressure fuel pipe on the main diesel generator. There were no connections between the two fires.
 On 17 March 2014 the ferry suffered a  gash caused by metal protruding from the lock gate at King George Dock. It meant that the ferry did not depart until 6am the next day, resulting in 168 passengers walking off and cancelling their trip. P&O Ferries spokesman Brian Reese said: "We want all our passengers to get away on their trip in good time, unfortunately this isn't always possible. People worked very hard through the night to get the ship away in the morning. In transport, we get technical glitches from time to time but, everyone did their best in the circumstances." More than 230 passengers stayed on board, many of whom are thought to have been long-distance lorry drivers.

References

Ferries of Belgium
Ferries of the United Kingdom
1986 ships
Ships of P&O Ferries
Ships built on the River Clyde
Ships built in Govan